Jasrat (Punjabi (Shahmukhi): جسرت, (Gurmukhi): ਜਸਰਤ, romanized: Jasarata, lit. 'Valiance'; Punjabi pronunciation: [dʒəsɾət]), born Mustafa Jasrat Shaikha Khokhar (Punjabi (Shahmukhi): مُصطَفٰی جَسرَت شیخا کھوکھَر, (Gurmukhi): ਮੁਸਤਫਾ ਜਸਰਤ ਸ਼ੇਖਾ ਖੋਖਰ)  was a Khokhar chieftain of Punjab, who reigned from 1420 to 1442. Jasrat succeeded his father, Shaikha Khokhar, after he died fighting the Timurid forces. He was known for inflicting heavy damage to the Delhi Sultanate and regaining most of the territories lost in his father's reign. He also consolidated the Khokhar Confederacy and was considered its finest ruler.

Early and personal life
Jasrat Khokhar was born to a local Muslim Rajput chieftain known as Shaikha Khokhar. In one of his father's battles, he was captured by Timurid Army and was held prisoner in Samarkand. However, due to his extra ordinary battle skills, he was appointed as a general in the Timurid army. For developing better relations with Timurids, he married a Timurid / Mughal Barlas princess, Sa'adat Sultan Agha who was the daughter of emperor Shah Rukh Mirza and granddaughter of Timur.Later, he left Samarkand and returned to Punjab after Timur's death.

Rise to power

After the death of his father Shaikha Khokhar, Jasrat was crowned as the chief of the Khokhar royal chiefdom. The following year, a civil war erupted in Kashmir between Zain-ul-Abidin and Ali Shah. Zain-ul-Abdin allied with Jasrat Khokhar and demanded for help against Ali Shah. Ali Shah was defeated and Zain-ul-Abidin retained the title of ruler of the Shah Mir Dynasty. Jasrat Khokhar was then awarded the Jammu region. Another ruler, named Rai Bhim from the Jammu region also united with Ali Shah, against the Khokhars and the ruler of the Shah Mir Dynasty. Rai Bhim and Ali Shah were then killed in battle against Jasrat. After these remarkable victories, Jasrat then set eyes on the throne of Delhi. He then took over Lahore, the same year, 1421.

References

Bibliography

15th-century Indian monarchs
Date of birth missing
1440s deaths